Louis-Philippe-Antoine Bélanger (April 17, 1907 – June 14, 1989) was a Canadian politician.  He first ran for the House of Commons of Canada in 1945 in the district of Charlevoix—Saguenay under the banner of the Social Credit Party of Canada, but was defeated.  Much later, in the 1962 election, he ran again in the district of Charlevoix and was elected.  He was re-elected in 1963 and left Parliament before the 1965 election.  Prior to his federal political experience, he was elected mayor of Beaupré, Quebec in 1945 and served until 1964. While mayor he led the effort to build the famous ski resort Mont-Sainte-Anne, which opened in 1966.

References

External links
 

1907 births
1989 deaths
People from Chaudière-Appalaches
Members of the House of Commons of Canada from Quebec
Social Credit Party of Canada MPs
French Quebecers